Refugio is a town in Refugio County, of which it is the county seat, in the U.S. state of Texas. The population was 2,890 as of the 2010 Census. Refugio is the birthplace of Baseball Hall of Fame member Nolan Ryan.

Geography 
Refugio is located at  (28.305812, −97.274594). According to the United States Census Bureau, the town has a total area of 1.6 square miles (4.0 km), all land.

Climate 
The climate in this area is characterized by hot, humid summers and generally mild to cool winters. According to the Köppen climate classification, Refugio has a humid subtropical climate, Cfa on climate maps.

Demographics

2020 census

As of the 2020 United States census, there were 2,712 people, 957 households, and 598 families residing in the town.

2000 census
As of the census of 2000, 2,941 people, 1,128 households, and 788 families resided in the town. The population density was 1,880.7 people per square mile (727.9/km). The 1,312 housing units averaged 839.0 per square mile (324.7/km). The racial makeup of the town was 74.53% White, 13.40% African American, 0.51% Native American, 0.51% Asian, 9.48% from other races, and 1.56% from two or more races. Hispanics or Latinos of any race were 44.30% of the population.

Of the 1,128 households, 30.9% had children under the age of 18 living with them, 46.5% were married couples living together, 18.2% had a female householder with no husband present, and 30.1% were notfamilies; 27.3% of the households were made up of individuals, and 13.8% had someone living alone who was 65 years of age or older. The average household size was 2.55, and the average family size was 3.08.

In the town, the population was distributed as 26.7% under the age of 18, 8.1% from 18 to 24, 25.1% from 25 to 44, 22.5% from 45 to 64, and 17.6% who were 65 years of age or older. The median age was 38 years. For every 100 females, there were 90.9 males. For every 100 females age 18 and over, there were 85.3 males. The median income for a household in the town was $26,719, and for a family was $32,237. Males had a median income of $33,021 versus $15,549 for females. The per capita income for the town was $13,523. About 16.8% of families and 21.1% of the population were below the poverty line, including 26.7% of those under age 18 and 20.9% of those age 65 or over.

Notable people 
 Rocky Bridges, Major League Baseball (MLB) infielder
 Dan Firova, MLB catcher, Washington Nationals bullpen coach, and Houston Astros coach (2022 World Series Win)
 Joseph L. Galloway, American newspaper correspondent and columnist
 Kim Henkel, co-writer, with Tobe Hooper, of the original film The Texas Chain Saw massacre
 Kermit Oliver, painter
 Allison Paige, country music singer-songwriter
 Nolan Ryan, MLB pitcher, all-time Major League leader in strikeouts, and member of the Baseball Hall of Fame
 Jack Starrett, film actor and director

Education 
The Town of Refugio is served by the Refugio Independent School District.

Sports 
The 1938 Refugio Oilers played minor league baseball as members of the Class D level Texas Valley League. The Brownsville Charros, Corpus Christi Spudders, Harlingen Hubs, McAllen Packers and Taft Cardinals joined Refugio in the league, which began play on April 14, 1938.

In 1947, future Baseball Hall of Famer Nolan Ryan was born in Refugio, though his family would move to Alvin, Texas, when Ryan was an infant.

Hurricane Harvey 

On August 23, 2017, Governor Greg Abbott published an emergency evacuation for the town of Refugio, following his state of emergency announcement on the state of Texas. On August 25, at peak intensity, Hurricane Harvey hit Refugio, causing significant damage to businesses and homes along US-77. Wind speeds were clocked up to 130 mph when the storm hit the town. Many professional storm trackers were storm chasing in Refugio during the peak of the storm, witnessing and documenting the experience. Several businesses in Refugio closed permanently in the aftermath of Harvey, and the town was without utilities for months.

References 

Towns in Refugio County, Texas
Towns in Texas
County seats in Texas
Irish-American history and culture in Texas